The Western Collegiate Hockey Association gives awards at the conclusion of each season.  The current awards include Player of the Year, Outstanding Student-Athlete of the Year, Defensive Player of the Year, Rookie of the Year, and Coach of the Year, as well as the league leaders in points scoring and goaltending.  In addition, several WCHA players have won the Hobey Baker Award for the nation's best college hockey player.

Past winners have included numerous National Hockey League players, players in European professional leagues, NHL All-Stars, Olympic gold medalists, Stanley Cup champions, and Hockey Hall of Famers.  Minnesota and North Dakota are the most successful teams, with 55 award winners and statistical leaders each.  All current and former members of the conference are represented, with the exception of Bowling Green.

No player has been selected for the same award more than twice.  Murray McLachlan of Minnesota was named Rookie of the Year and twice named Player of the Year, the only player to be selected for three awards.  Minnesota's John Mayasich and Michigan Tech's Tony Esposito are the only players to lead the conference statistically in three seasons.  John MacInnes of Michigan Tech was named Coach of the Year five times.

The Outstanding Student-Athlete of the Year is chosen by a vote of faculty athletic representatives, while the Defensive Player of the Year is chosen by the league's head coaches.  All other award winners are selected by votes from coaches, players, sports information directors, and local media.

All extant awards were discontinued in 2021 when the men's division of the WCHA was dissolved.

Hobey Baker Award

The Hobey Baker Award has been awarded annually since 1981 to the most outstanding player in NCAA ice hockey.  In that time, 16 players have won the award while playing for WCHA schools.

Winners

Winners by school

Player of the Year

The Player of the Year award has been awarded since the 1960–61 season. Before 1992, it was known as the Most Valuable Player award.

Winners

Winners by school

Offensive Player of the Year
The Offensive Player of the Year was first awarded in 2019.

Winners

Winners by school

Outstanding Student-Athlete of the Year

Winners

Winners by school

Defensive Player of the Year

Winners

Winners by school

Goaltender of the Year

Winners

Winners by school

Rookie of the Year

Winners

Winners by school

Coach of the Year

Winners

Winners by school

Statistical leaders

Scoring leaders

The scoring champion was determined based on all games from 1951–52 until 1961–62.  Since, only statistics from conference games are included.

Winners by school

Goaltending leaders

The goaltending champion was based on all games from 1951–52 until 1955–56 and based on only league games since.

Winners by school

References

Awards, men
College ice hockey trophies and awards in the United States